Yevgeny Murzin (1914–1970) was a Russian audio engineer and inventor of the ANS synthesizer.

Murzin's synthesizer
In 1938,  invented a design for composers based on synthesizing complex musical sounds from a limited number of pure tones; this proposed system was to perform music without musicians or musical instruments. The technological basis of his invention was the method of photo-optic sound recording used in cinematography, which made it possible to obtain a visible image of a sound wave, as well as to realize the opposite goal—synthesizing a sound from an artificially drawn sound wave.

Despite the apparent simplicity of his idea of reconstructing a sound from its visible image, the technical realization of the ANS as a musical instrument did not occur until twenty years later.
Murzin was an engineer who worked in areas unrelated to music, and the development of the ANS synthesizer was a hobby and he had many problems realizing on a practical level.  It was not until 1958 that Murzin was able to establish a laboratory and gather a group of engineers and musicians in order to design the ANS.

Legacy
Murzin's synthesizer was used by Alfred Schnittke, Stanislav Kreitchi, Sofia Gubaydulina, Edward Artemyev, and some other experimenting composers in Moscow.
Much of the music for Andrey Tarkovsky film Solaris (1972) was created by Artemyev with the ANS.
In 2003, British band Coil had released an album named ANS (using the synth itself).

External links
Link
From the Thermin center 1
From the Thermin center 2

Russian audio engineers
1970 deaths
1914 births
Graphical sound
Soviet inventors